is a Japanese mecha anime television series that was produced by Eiken. There were 47 episodes aired at 25 minutes each.  It is also known as "UFO Senshi Dai-Apolon", "UFO Soldier Dai-Apolon", "UFO Robo Dai-Apolon", "Daiapolon", "Shadow World".

Synopsis
The series is about a 16-year-old boy Takeshi who recently formed an American football team at the Blue Sky orphanage.  One day the game is interrupted by a light in the sky.  Takeshi discovers he is the son of the king of the planet Apolon, spirited away to Earth by his father's retainer Labi to avoid death at the hands of General Dazaan.  He turns out to have special energy abilities which can control UFO saucers from a base under the ocean floor. His friends Miki, Matsuo and Goro also become pilots.  They magically change into their uniforms every time they yell U! F! O!.  
There are three robots: Header (Head); Trangur (Trunk) and Legger (Leg). They combine into a larger and powerful robot called Daiapolon. Through a solar-powered process known as "body fusion", activated by the "Key Energy" device placed inside the boy's chest, Takeshi can "grow" in mass and become a giant humanoid, thus "wearing" the Daiapolon as a kind of cybernetical armour.

Development
The anime was loosely based on the manga Galactic Warrior Apolon by creator Tetsu Kariya (which also created the manga Oishinbo) and illustrator Shigeru Tsuchiyama (serialized in Weekly Shonen King, which also serialized the first run of the Galaxy Express 999 manga).  That manga featured a 15-year-old orphan called Akira. Although there are UFO scenes in the manga, it did not have the American football or super robot elements, and the enemies were demons with the power of the 108 Stars of Destiny.  It was unusual for the football element to be added, since the sport was barely even recognized as an amateur sport in Japan in the mid 1970s.  It may just be a coincidental blend to add variety to the super robot genre.

The original run ended at 26 episodes, followed by 21 episodes of UFO Warrior Dai Apolon II.  Some episodes of this combined new footage and re-edited footage from the first series, and the rest were reruns.

English release
Five episodes were combined and dubbed in English to create a re-edited movie called Shadow World. The setting was changed to California and the names of the protagonists were changed to American ones, although Dai Apolon and some of the villains kept their names. This movie was released on video in 1986.

Voice actors

Staff
 Screenwriter  Takao Koyama  Okihara Matsumoto  Noboru Shiroyama  Soji Yoshikawa  Seiji Matsuoka
 Creator  Tetsu Kariya
 Design  Toyoo Ashida
 Animation  Keijiro Kimura  Takashi Kakuta  Konio Okoto  Toyoo Ashida
 Music  Masahisa Takeichi

References

External links
 Super Robot info
 Detailed review of the English language release
 
 

1976 anime television series debuts
1977 Japanese television series endings
Eiken (studio)
Super robot anime and manga
TBS Television (Japan) original programming